The Crime of Aldeia Velha (Portuguese: O Crime da Aldeia Velha) is a 1964 Portuguese drama film directed by Manuel Guimarães.

Cast
 Clara D'Ovar 
 Alma Flora 
 Lídia Franco 
 Miguel Franco
 Cremilda Gil as (voice)  
 Rui Gomes as Priest  
 Barbara Laage as Joana  
 Maria Olguim as Zefa  
 Rogério Paulo as Rui  
 Mário Pereira as António  
 Glicínia Quartin 
Clara Rocha 
 Maria Schultz

References

Bibliography 
 Luís Reis Torgal. Estados novos, estado novo: ensaios de história política e cultural vol. II. Coimbra University Press, 2009.

External links 
 

1964 films
1964 drama films
Portuguese drama films
1960s Portuguese-language films